Nathaniel Varney Massaquoi (1905–1962) was a Liberian educator and politician, from the Vai community.

Early life
Massaquoi was born on 13 June 1905 in Cape Mount, Liberia. His father was Momolu Massaquoi (1869–1938) (also known as Momolu IV), a Liberian king of the Gallinas kingdom prior to its dissolution by the British. Nathaniel studied at the College of West Africa before his father was assigned as consul general to Germany for 1922–1930. Massaquoi followed his family to Hamburg, where he lived and studied.

Career
Massaquoi studied law, and also worked as an English and mathematics teacher in Sierra Leone.

In 1940 he and a number of other Liberian leaders were arrested for allegedly plotting the assassination of President Edwin J. Barclay and overthrow of the government. Massaquoi was released in 1944, along with other political prisoners following the inauguration of president President William Tubman, who decried Barclay's "illegal arrest of peaceful citizens without warrant"".

Massaquoi served various judgeships from 1945-1960, and served as secretary of public instruction from 1957–1962. Massaquoi died in 1962 in a hospital in Hamburg, Germany.

References

External links
Curriculum Vitae, UNESCO executive board election, 14 October 1954

Liberian educators
Liberian politicians
Massaquoi family
People from Grand Cape Mount County
1905 births
1962 deaths
Grand Crosses 1st class of the Order of Merit of the Federal Republic of Germany